Girja Kumari  was an Indian politician. She was elected to the Lok Sabha, the lower house of the Parliament of India from the Shahdol in Madhya Pradesh as a member of the Indian National Congress.

References

External links
Official biographical sketch in Parliament of India website

Indian National Congress politicians from Madhya Pradesh
India MPs 1967–1970
Lok Sabha members from Madhya Pradesh
People from Shahdol district
Women members of the Lok Sabha